Zádiel is a village and municipality in Košice-okolie District in the Kosice Region of eastern Slovakia.

History
In historical records, the village was first mentioned in 1317.

Geography
It has a population of 160 people.

References

External links
 Zádiel
Zádielska dolina

Villages and municipalities in Košice-okolie District